Karthick Devaraj (born as Karthikeyan Devaraj; 4th August 1991)  is an Indian Musician based in Chennai, Tamil Nadu, India. He has been in the spotlight here since appearing in a television singing reality show as a part of "Mani & Band". His performance served as inspiration for AR Rahman, who has included Karthick on numerous live stage shows and in addition karthick have worked with him to play the piano for the song ''vera level sago'' from the movie Ayalaan. Also, along with AR Rahman and Yuvan Shankar Raja, Karthick has performed on many live concert. 

Karthick's first independent song as a composer was "NO NO NO NO" in 2021. In 2022, Karthick Devaraj composed and released a song ''Nam Palli Nam Perumai'' for Tamil Nadu Educational Department in collaboration with Therukural Arivu.

Discography

Independent Song(s)

References

External links

Year of birth missing (living people)
Living people